The 2008 Generali Ladies Linz was a women's tennis tournament played on indoor hard courts. It was the 22nd edition of the Generali Ladies Linz, and was part of the Tier II Series of the 2008 WTA Tour. It took place at the TipsArena Linz in Linz, Austria, from October 20 through October 26, 2008. Ana Ivanovic won the singles title.

Finals

Singles

 Ana Ivanovic defeated  Vera Zvonareva 6–2, 6–1
It was Ana Ivanović's 3rd title of the year, and her 8th overall.

Doubles

 Katarina Srebotnik /  Ai Sugiyama defeated  Cara Black /  Liezel Huber 6–4, 7–5

External links
Official website
Singles, Doubles and Qualifying Singles Draws

Generali Ladies Linz
2008
Generali Ladies Linz
Generali Ladies Linz
Generali